Alberto is the Romance version of the Latinized form (Albertus) of Germanic Adalbert.  It is used in Italian, Portuguese and Spanish. It derives from the Old German Athala (meaning noble) and Berth (meaning bright). Notable people with the name include:

 Adalberto the Margrave (fl. 10th century), Italian noble-man
 Adalberto Tejeda Olivares (1888–1960), Mexican politician
 Prince Adalberto, Duke of Bergamo (1898–1982), Italian general and nobleman
 Adalberto Libera (1903–1963), Italian architect
 Adalberto Cardoso (1905–1972), Brazilian long-distance runner
 Adalberto Pereira dos Santos (1905–1984), Brazilian general and politician
 Adalberto Ortiz (1914–2003), Ecuadorian politician
 Adalberto Martinez (1916–2003), Mexican actor
 Adalberto Almeida y Merino (1916–2008), Mexican Catholic prelate
 Adalberto López (1923–1996), Mexican football striker
 Adalberto Lepri (1929–2014), Italian wrestler
 Adalberto Rodríguez (1934–2015), Puerto Rican actor and comedian
 Adalberto Arturo Rosat (1934–2015), Bolivian bishop
 Adalberto Santiago (born 1937), Puerto Rican salsa singer
 Adalberto Hernández (born 1938), Mexican boxer
 Adalberto Maria Merli (born 1938), Italian actor
 Adalberto Scorza (born 1938), Argentine race walker
 Adalberto Giazotto (1940–2017), Italian physicist
 Adalberto Rodríguez Giavarini (born 1944), Argentine economist and diplomat
 Adalberto Siebens (born 1946), Puerto Rican boxer
 Adalberto Álvarez (born 1948), Cuban pianist and composer
 Adalberto Álvarez y su Son, Cuban band by the pianist
 Adalberto Álvarez Marines (born 1952), Mexican artist
 Adalberto Campos Fernandes (born 1958), Portuguese politician
 Adalberto Jordan (born 1961), Cuban-American judge
 Adal Ramones (born 1961), Mexican television show host
 Adalberto Costa Júnior (born 1962), Angolan politician
 Adalberto Machado (born 1964), Brazilian football left-back
 Adalberto Bravo (born 1965), Venezuelan-American musician
 Adalberto García (born 1967), Brazilian long-distance runner
 Adalberto Figarolo di Gropello (fl. 1967–1971), Italian diplomat
 Adalberto Madero (born 1969), Mexican lawyer and politician
 Adalberto Ribeiro (born 1969), Portuguese football centre-back
 Adalberto Mendez (athlete) (born 1974), Dominican sprinter
 Adalberto Silva (born 1979), Brazilian volleyball player
 Adalberto Palma (born 1981), Mexican football defender
 Adalberto Méndez (born 1982), Dominican baseball player
 Adalberto Román (born 1987), Paraguayan football centre-back
 Adalberto (footballer, born 1964), Brazilian football left back
 Adalberto (footballer, born 1987), Brazilian football centre-back
 Adalberto Mejía (born 1993), Dominican baseball pitcher
 Adalberto Mondesí (born 1996), American baseball player
 Adalberto Peñaranda (born 1997), Venezuelan football forward
 Adalberto Carrasquilla (born 1998), Panamanian football midfielder
 Adalberto Ottone Rielander (died 2002), Papua New Guinean clergyman and bishop
 Adalberto Velasco (fl. 2006), Mexican politician

See also
 
 Adalbert (disambiguation)
 Adelbert (disambiguation)
 Alberto (disambiguation)
 Albert (disambiguation)

References

Spanish masculine given names